was a Japanese athlete who competed mainly in the triple jump. In this event he won a silver medal at the 1936 Olympics. He won two more silver medals, in the long jump and triple jump, at the 1934 Far Eastern Championship Games.

References

1912 births
2000 deaths
Japanese male long jumpers
Japanese male triple jumpers
Olympic male long jumpers
Olympic male triple jumpers
Olympic athletes of Japan
Olympic silver medalists for Japan
Olympic silver medalists in athletics (track and field)
Athletes (track and field) at the 1936 Summer Olympics
Medalists at the 1936 Summer Olympics
Japan Championships in Athletics winners
20th-century Japanese people